The 2014 BRD Bucharest Open was a professional tennis tournament played on red clay courts. It was the 1st edition of the tournament and part of the 2014 WTA Tour. It took place at Arenele BNR in Bucharest, Romania between 7 and 13 July 2014.

Points and prize money

Point distribution

Prize money

Singles main-draw entrants

Seeds 

 1 Rankings as of June 23, 2014.

Other entrants 
The following players received wildcards into the main draw:
  Cristina Dinu  
  Andreea Mitu 
  Raluca Olaru

The following players received entry from the qualifying draw:
  Kiki Bertens
  Sesil Karatantcheva
  Anett Kontaveit
  Elitsa Kostova

The following player received entry as a lucky loser:
  Indy de Vroome

Withdrawals
Before the tournament
  Julia Glushko
  Vania King
  Kristina Mladenovic
  Shahar Pe'er
  Yaroslava Shvedova
  Alison Van Uytvanck
  Barbora Záhlavová-Strýcová

WTA doubles main-draw entrants

Seeds 

 1 Rankings as of June 23, 2014.

Other entrants 
The following pairs received wildcards into the main draw:
  Elena Bogdan /  Alexandra Cadanțu
  Ioana Ducu /  Ioana Loredana Roșca

The following pair received entry as alternates:
  Tamara Čurović /  Elitsa Kostova

Withdrawals 
Before the tournament
  Verónica Cepede Royg (elbow injury)

Champions

Singles 

  Simona Halep def.  Roberta Vinci, 6–1, 6–3

Doubles 

  Elena Bogdan /  Alexandra Cadanțu def.  Çağla Büyükakçay /  Karin Knapp, 6–4, 3–6, [10–5]

References

External links 

Official website  
 

BRD Bucharest Open
BRD Bucharest Open
2014 in Romanian tennis
July 2014 sports events in Romania
BCR